Joan Smith (born June 25, 1967) is an American biathlete. She competed at the 1992 Winter Olympics and the 1994 Winter Olympics.

References

External links
 

1967 births
Living people
Biathletes at the 1992 Winter Olympics
Biathletes at the 1994 Winter Olympics
American female biathletes
Olympic biathletes of the United States
Sportspeople from Rochester, New York
21st-century American women